Bainbridge Historic District is a national historic district located at Bainbridge in Chenango County, New York. The district includes 93 contributing buildings, two contributing sites, one contributing structure, and one contributing object.  It encompasses the village's most intensive concentration of historically and architecturally significant properties.  It includes commercial, residential, civic, and ecclesiastical buildings.  It includes the village green with bandstand and the adjacent United Presbyterian Church (1831) and St. Peter's Episcopal Church (1826).  Other notable buildings include the Bainbridge Town Hall (1909), Old Jericho Tavern (1805, 1817), and First United Methodist Church (1902).  Located within the district are the house and carriage house of the separately listed Charles C. Hovey House and Strong Leather Company Mill.

It was added to the National Register of Historic Places in 1982.

Gallery

References

Historic districts on the National Register of Historic Places in New York (state)
Historic districts in Chenango County, New York
National Register of Historic Places in Chenango County, New York